Anthony Ormerod (born 31 March 1979) is an English former professional footballer who played as a midfielder.

Career

Middlesbrough
Anthoney Ormerod started his career at Middlesbrough and scored on his debut in a 2–2 draw against Bradford City in the First Division on 13 September 1997. His next goal came in a 3–1 win against QPR on 8 November. He scored again seven days later in the 3–1 victory against Norwich. Overall, he made 23 appearances in his first season with Middlesbrough as the Teesside club regained promotion to the Premier League.

Marske United
Ormerod joined Northern League Division 2 side Marske in 2010 after being signed by then manager Paul Burton. He helped the club achieve promotion in 2010–11 with the team finishing 3rd. The next year the team consolidated and survived relegation, finishing 18th in the Northern League Division 1. Overall Ormerod has made 79 appearances for the Seasiders and has scored 7 goals to present.

References

External links

1979 births
Living people
Footballers from Middlesbrough
English footballers
Association football midfielders
Middlesbrough F.C. players
Carlisle United F.C. players
Bury F.C. players
York City F.C. players
Hartlepool United F.C. players
Scarborough F.C. players
Whitby Town F.C. players
Spennymoor Town F.C. players
Marske United F.C. players
Premier League players
English Football League players